Diana Šatkauskaitė (born 23 January 1992) is a Lithuanian handballer who currently plays for HC SM Garliava.  She was born in Šiauliai and is a member of the Lithuanian national team.

In 2013 Šatkausaitė was announced as MVP of Lithuanian Women's Championships.

Achievements

Lithuanian Women's Handball League:
2011

References

1992 births
Living people
Lithuanian female handball players
Sportspeople from Šiauliai